CounterPunch is a left-wing online magazine. Content includes a free section published five days a week as well as a subscriber-only area called CounterPunch+, where original articles are published weekly. CounterPunch is based in the United States and covers politics in a manner its editors describe as "muckraking with a radical attitude".

History
CounterPunch began as a newsletter, established in 1994 by the Washington, D.C.-based investigative reporter Ken Silverstein. He was soon joined by Alexander Cockburn and then Jeffrey St. Clair, who became the publication's editors in 1996 when Silverstein left. In 2007, Cockburn and St. Clair wrote that in founding CounterPunch they had "wanted it to be the best muckraking newsletter in the country", and cited as inspiration such pamphleteers as Edward Abbey, Peter Maurin, and Ammon Hennacy, as well as the socialist/populist newspaper Appeal to Reason (1895–1922). When Alexander Cockburn died in 2012 at the age of 71, environmental journalist Joshua Frank became managing editor and Jeffrey St. Clair became editor-in-chief of CounterPunch.

During the 2016 presidential election, CounterPunch published a piece attributed to Alice Donovan, who purported to be a freelance writer but US intelligence officials alleged to be a pseudonymous employee of the Russian government. Donovan was tracked by the FBI for nine months, as a suspected fictitious persona created by the GRU.  In late November 2017, after CounterPunch had published several more pieces by Donovan, The Washington Post contacted Jeffrey St. Clair about her. The co-editor said that Donovan's pitches did not stand out among the pitches that CounterPunch received daily and began making inquiries. He asked Donovan to substantiate her identity by sending a photo of her driving license but she did not. On the same day The Washington Post article about Donovan was published, St. Clair and Frank published a piece stating that CounterPunch only ran one article by Alice Donovan during the 2016 election, which was on cyber-breaches of medical databases. Donovan was also exposed by the newsletter as a serial plagiarizer. CounterPunch removed all of the articles from their site. In a January 2018 follow-up article, St. Clair and Frank exposed a network of alleged trolls that operated a site called Inside Syria Media Center, promoting a pro-Bashar al-Assad and pro-Russian view of the Syrian Civil War. St. Clair and Frank speculated that the website was connected to the same network of trolls as Alice Donovan, which was later confirmed by the Atlantic Council and other researchers.

Reception
In 2003, The Observer described the CounterPunch website as "one of the most popular political sources in America, with a keen following in Washington". Other sources have variously described CounterPunch as "left-wing", "far-left", "extreme", a "political newsletter", and a "muckraking newsletter".

In 2016, CounterPunch appeared in a PropOrNot list of websites which it described as Russian propaganda outlets. Writing in the New Yorker, Adrian Chen described the list as a mess and CounterPunch as a "respected left-leaning" publication.

In 2018, after the Alice Donovan affair, author Diana Johnstone said in a Consortium News article titled "Antifa or Antiwar: Leftist Exclusionism Against the Quest for Peace" that "Russophobia finds a variant in the writing of several prominent CounterPunch contributors".

References

External links
 

Bimonthly magazines published in the United States
Political magazines published in the United States
Left-wing politics in the United States
Magazines established in 1994
Magazines published in California